The Bhutan Tendrel Party (BTP) is a political party in Bhutan. It was founded by Dasho Pema Chewang following his resignation as Secretary of the National Land Commission in November 2022.

Following election guidelines, the party held a "convention for registration" on 29 November 2022. During the meeting, core party members, supporters and dzongkhag coordinators elected the party President, Vice Presidents, Executive Committee Members, General Secretary, Treasurer and other office bearers.

After submitting all required documents to the Election Commission of Bhutan, BTP received the approval for registration on 9 January 2023. 

Soon after its registration with the ECB, BTP began its familiarization tour across the country. The party also held its first General Assembly in Thimphu on 30 January 2023.

Tendrel

Tendrel is a natural law of inter-dependence, dependent origination or the law of cause and effect. The name also connotes auspiciousness, virtue, wellness and harmony. Tendrel unifies and strengthens all the positive energy and then consecrates the way ahead for a good cause. The BTP states that Tendrel heralds the beginning of a new era, a brave and prosperous new Bhutan.

Party symbol

The elephant is BTP's symbol. The party states that the elephant is an icon of strength, character, stability and power. Elephants are believed to carry the wisdom, memory and intelligence of the ages.

President

Bhutan Tendrel Party’s President is Dasho Pema Chewang. He is the former secretary of National Land Commission and served for 32 years in the civil service. He has a Master’s degree in Development Economics from the Australian National University.

Candidates

Bhutan Tendrel Party has “a mix of highly capable and competent candidates from a wide range of educational backgrounds, experience, and ages."

2023 election candidates
The party announced some of its candidates for the 2023 elections shortly after its foundation.

External links 
Bhutan Tendrel Party on Facebook
Official Website

References

Political parties in Bhutan
Political parties established in 2023